In enzymology, an indole-3-acetaldehyde reductase (NADPH) is an enzyme that catalyzes the chemical reaction

(indol-3-yl)ethanol + NADP+  (indol-3-yl)acetaldehyde + NADPH + H+

Thus, the two substrates of this enzyme are (indol-3-yl)ethanol and NADP+, whereas its 3 products are (indol-3-yl)acetaldehyde, NADPH, and H+.

This enzyme belongs to the family of oxidoreductases, specifically those acting on the CH-OH group of donor with NAD+ or NADP+ as acceptor. The systematic name of this enzyme class is (indol-3-yl)ethanol:NADP+ oxidoreductase. Other names in common use include indoleacetaldehyde (reduced nicotinamide adenine dinucleotide, phosphate) reductase, indole-3-acetaldehyde reductase (NADPH), and indole-3-ethanol:NADP+ oxidoreductase. This enzyme participates in tryptophan metabolism.

References 

 

EC 1.1.1
NADPH-dependent enzymes
Enzymes of unknown structure